British Speleological Association (BSA) was founded by Eli Simpson and others in 1935. It was instrumental in the discovery of Lancaster Hole and other caves. In 1973, it merged with the Cave Research Group of Great Britain to form the British Cave Research Association (BCRA).

Publications 
As a scientific organisation, the BSA published two periodicals between 1947 and 1973, the Journal of the British Speleological Association and the Proceedings of the British Speleological Association.

See also 

 Caving in the United Kingdom

References

External links 
 Index to the Journal and Proceedings of the British Speleological Association, published by the BCRA

Caving organisations in the United Kingdom
1935 establishments in the United Kingdom
Sports organizations established in 1935